A jackhammer is a percussive drill.

Jackhammer may also refer to:
 Jackhammer, a vertical suplex powerslam
 Jackhammer (comics), a Marvel Comics villain
 Joliet JackHammers, a professional baseball team based in Joliet, Illinois
 MTX Jackhammer, a  subwoofer
 Pancor Jackhammer, an automatic-shotgun design

Jack Hammer may refer to:
 "Jack" Hammer, a character in the Rescue Heroes line
 Jack Hammer, a professional wrestler from  United States Wrestling Association
 "Jack Hammer", a song by the Odds from their album Bedbugs
 Jack Hammer (songwriter) (1925–2016), pseudonym for songwriter and singer Earl Burroughs
 Jack Hammer (South African band)
 Otis Blackwell or Jack Hammer (1931–2002), African-American singer and songwriter

See also
 Weasel (Marvel Comics), aka Jack Hammer